Nellyville is the second studio album by American rapper and singer Nelly. It was released on June 25, 2002, by Universal Records and Fo' Reel Entertainment. The album's production was handled by Waiel Yaghnam, the Neptunes, Jay E, Trackboyz, Ryan Bowser, and Just Blaze. Two singles from Nellyville, "Hot in Herre" and "Dilemma", both topped the US Billboard Hot 100 for respectively seven and ten weeks. The album received generally favorable reviews from music critics, who praised the production.

Nellyville debuted at the top of the US Billboard 200, with sales of 715,000 equivalent-units in the opening week of the country. It remained at number one for four non-consecutive weeks and was eventually certified six-times platinum by the Recording Industry Association of America (RIAA) for shipments of over six million equivalent-units in sales, which allowed Nellyville to become Nelly's second number-one, multi-platinum, and top-10 album in the United States following his debut album Country Grammar in 2000. As of March 16, 2011, Nellyville sold 6,488,000 copies in the United States, and it became the 14th best-selling rap album of all time. Internationally, it peaked at number two on the album charts in the United Kingdom, Australia, Canada, Germany, and New Zealand.

Production 

The recording of Nellyville was handled by Steve Eigner and Marc Lee. Rich Travali was assisted by Jeff Robinette, while Jamie Duncan and Dan Milazzo were performing the mixing on the album. Audio mastering was done by Herb Powers. The album's artwork was provided by Sandy Brummels, while Robert Sims handled design, and Jonathan Mannion was responsible for photography. Several artists made an appearance on the album, including Justin Timberlake, Kelly Rowland, Beanie Sigel, Freeway and Dani Stevenson.

Critical reception 

Nellyville received generally positive reviews from music critics. At Metacritic, which assigns a normalized rating out of 100 to reviews from mainstream critics, the album has received an average score of 70, based on 15 reviews, which indicates "generally favorable reviews". Wayne Franklin of PopMatters held low expectations for the album prior to listening to it, following Nelly's feud with rapper KRS-One, but found its music to be "incredible". Wayne lauded the track "Air Force Ones", describing it as an "unbelievable ode" to hip hop, while noting several other songs as stand-outs. Allmusic's Jason Birchmeier gave the album three-and-a-half stars out of five, noting "Hot in Herre", "Dilemma" and "Roc the Mic" as "three well-calculated, standout moments". Birchmeier praised "Hot in Herre"'s production, "Roc the Mic"'s hip hop composition and the "Dilemma"'s interpolation of Patti LaBelle's "Love, Need and Want You". RapReviews.com's Steve Juon gave Nellyville an 8.5 out of ten, citing the album's consistency and production, praising "Hot in Herre" for its Midwestern drawl and "harmonious musical flow". Giving the album a B+, Tom Sinclair of Entertainment Weekly praised several new additions to Nelly's vocal style, summarizing: "If you like your rap loose and funny, Nelly's the man for you".

NME Dele Fadele saw Nellyville as Nelly's "reply to the haters"; Fadele described the album as a "glossy, well-produced album of populist anthems with a gangsta undertow" that expands his perspective of the world and "celebrates success". Though Fadele wasn't impressed at the Justin Timberlake featured track "Work It", calling the song a "silly pop-directed collaboration". The A.V. Clubs Nathan Rabin praised Nellyville for achieving similar universal appeal to Nelly's previous effort Country Grammar, which achieved it with songs such as its self-titled track and "E.I.". Rabin criticized Timberlake's "high-schooler doing a Bee Gees impersonation" on "Work It", though noted the song as the only "glaring misstep" on the album. People lauded "Hot in Herre" for its "funky go-go groove", declaring it the "perfect summer jam", but were ambivalent towards the rest of the album's beats for being slightly repetitive. Rolling Stone Rob Marriott described Nelly as a "gifted, witty MC" with the "catchiest rhymes to ever hit the pop charts" but wrote that Nellyville sounds "weighted down" by the commercial pressure of having to have another multi-platinum album.

 Accolades 
At the 45th Annual Grammy Awards, Nellyville was nominated for Album of the Year and Best Rap Album, "Dilemma" won Best Rap/Sung Collaboration and was nominated for Record of the Year, and "Hot in Herre" won Best Male Rap Solo Performance. Nelly received three BET Award nominations such as Best Male Hip-Hop Artist, Best Collaboration (for "Dilemma") and Video of the Year (for "Hot in Herre"). At the 2003's American Music Awards, Nelly was nominated for Favorite Pop/Rock Male Artist and the Fan's Choice Award, while Nellyville was nominated for Favorite Pop/Rock Album and Favorite Hip/Hop/R&B Album, with Nelly winning the Fan's Choice Award. Nelly received six awards at the 2002's Billboard Music Awards, winning the awards for Artist of the Year, Male Artist of the Year, Hot 100 Singles Male Artist of the Year, R&B/Hip-Hop Male Artist of the Year, Rap Artist of the Year and Rap Track of the Year (for "Hot in Herre"). On the 2002's Billboard year-end charts, the album was ranked third on the Billboard 200 and the Top R&B/Hip Hop Albums charts.

 Commercial performance 
North America
The album debuted at No. 1 on the US Billboard 200, selling 715,000 copies, outperforming Nelly's previous effort Country Grammar (2000), which debuted at number 3 selling 235,000 copies. With the single, "Hot in Herre" debuting at No. 1 on the US Billboard Hot 100 that week, Nelly was in possession of the top spot on 10 different Billboard charts.  After its release, Nellyville remained atop the Billboard 200, selling 450,000 in its first week and 340,000 in its second week, surpassing 1.5 million copies in sales in its 3rd week. In its fourth week, Nellyville replaced atop the chart by Dave Matthews Band's Busted Stuff. The former album was positioned at No. 2 on the Billboard 200, with its sales decreasing to 305,000 copies. In the 5th week, it sold 271,000 copies, dropping from #2 to No. 3, and in its sixth week, it sold 244,000 copies remaining at number 3. Nellville reached to No. 2 and sold 210,000 units in its 7th week of release and in its 8th week, topping the Billboard 200, accumulating to 4 non-consecutive weeks atop. The album sold 185,000 copies that week. Nellyville 4-week #1 run and sales were, according to Billboard, largely in part to the success of the album's singles, "Hot in Herre" and "Dilemma". The former track was number one on the Hot 100 prior to the album's release, maintaining a third week atop the chart, when Nellville made its debut. The song topped the Hot 100 for 7 consecutive weeks before being replaced by its successor, "Dilemma", which topped the chart for 10 non-consecutive weeks, selling worldwide over 7.6 million copies. (in Italian) On June 9, 2003, Nellyville was certified Sex-tuple Platinum by the Recording Industry Association of America (RIAA) for shipments of over 6 million copies in the United States of America. On March 16, 2011, the album sold 6,490,000 copies in the United States, becoming the fourteenth best-selling rap album of all time. Nellyville was ranked as the 174th best album of all time on the Billboard Top 200 Albums of All Time.

Europe and Oceania
Nellyville debuted and peaked at No. 2 on the UK Albums Chart on the week of July 13, 2002, remaining on the chart for 40 weeks. On July 1, 2002, the album was certified Double Platinum by the British Phonographic Industry (BPI), for shipments of 600,000 copies. On the Australian Albums Chart, it debuted and peaked at No. 2 for two weeks, staying within the top 10 for 16 non-consecutive weeks. The album dropped off the chart after 31 weeks, and was certified Triple Platinum by the Australian Recording Industry Association (ARIA) for shipments of 210,000 copies. Nellyville also peaked at No. 2 on the New Zealand Albums Chart, Canadian Albums Chart and German Albums Chart. It remained on the chart in New Zealand for 30 weeks, in Canada for 18 weeks and in Germany for 33 weeks. It was certified Double Platinum by Recorded Music NZ and Quadruple Platinum by Music Canada. the album was certified Gold by the Bundesverband Musikindustrie (BVMI). Nellyville also achieved success in several other territories, peaking within the top ten in Ireland, Netherlands, Denmark, Finland, Switzerland, Norway, Austria and Belgian (Flanders). It was certified Gold by IFPI Austria for shipments of 15,000 and certified Platinum by IFPI Switzerland for shipments of 40,000 copies The album reached at number 11 in Sweden and #25 in Belgium (Wallonia) and France. The Swedish Recording Industry Association (GLF) awarded the album a Gold certification, for shipments of over 30,000 copies.

 Track listing Sample credits "Hot in Herre" contains an interpolation of "Bustin' Loose" performed by Chuck Brown.
 "Pimp Juice" contains a sample from the medley of "Love Comes in All Colors" performed by The Staple Singers.
 "Dilemma" contains elements of "Love, Need and Want You" performed by Patti LaBelle and samples “Misunderstanding” by D Train,  “BMW" by Phemza The Kween, and "R&B" by Lil Swae.

 Personnel 
Credits adapted from liner notes.Main artistNellyAdditional musiciansJustin Timberlake – appearance
Kelly Rowland – appearance
Beanie Sigel – appearance
Freeway – appearance
Dani Stevenson – appearanceTechnicalSteve Eigner – recording
Marc Lee – recording, assistance

Rich Travali – mixing
Jeff Robinette – mixing, assistance
Jamie Duncan – mixing, assistance
Dan Milazzo – mixing, assistance
Herb Powers – masteringOther'
Sandy Brummels – art directing
Robert Sims – design
Jonathan Mannion – photography

Charts

Weekly charts

Year-end charts

Certifications

See also 
 List of number-one albums of 2002 (U.S.)
 List of number-one R&B albums of 2002 (U.S.)

References 

2002 albums
Albums produced by Just Blaze
Albums produced by the Neptunes
Nelly albums
Universal Records albums